Enoch Arden is a two-part 1911 short silent drama film, based on the 1864 Tennyson poem of the same name. It was directed by D. W. Griffith, starred Wilfred Lucas and featured Blanche Sweet. A print of the film survives in the film archive of the Library of Congress.

Cast
 Wilfred Lucas as Enoch Arden
 Linda Arvidson as Annie Lee
 Francis J. Grandon as Philip Ray
 George Nichols as The Captain
 Edward Dillon
 Joseph Graybill as A Shipwrecked Sailor
 Grace Henderson
 Florence Lee as On the Beach
 Jeanie MacPherson as On the Beach
 Alfred Paget as A Shipwrecked Sailor
 Blanche Sweet as On the Beach
 Robert Harron as Teenage Arden Son
 Florence La Badie as Teenage Arden Daughter
 William J. Butler as In Bar
 Guy Hedlund as On Rescue Ship
 Dell Henderson as Rescuer
 Henry Lehrman as On Rescue Ship
 W. C. Robinson as Rescuer
 Charles West as In Bar (as Charles H. West)

See also
 List of American films of 1911
 D. W. Griffith filmography
 Blanche Sweet filmography

References

External links

 Enoch Arden Part I on YouTube
 Enoch Arden Part II on YouTube

1911 films
1911 drama films
1911 short films
Silent American drama films
American silent short films
American black-and-white films
Biograph Company films
Films based on Enoch Arden
Films directed by D. W. Griffith
1910s American films